The 2022 Cherwell District Council election was held on 5 May 2022 to elect members of Cherwell District Council in England. This was on the same day as other local elections.

Results summary

Ward results

Adderbury, Bloxham and Bodicote

Banbury Calthorpe and Easington

Banbury Cross and Neithrop

Banbury Grimsbury and Hightown

Banbury Hardwick

Banbury Ruscote

Bicester East

Bicester North and Caversfield

Bicester South and Ambrosden

Bicester West

Cropredy, Sibfords and Wroxton

Deddington

Fringford and Heyfords

Kidlington East

Kidlington West

Launton and Otmoor

References

Cherwell District Council elections
Cherwell